Cameron Hardy Castleberry (born March 14, 1995) is an American soccer midfielder who last played for the Washington Spirit of the National Women's Soccer League.

Early life and collegiate career
Castleberry attended Ravenscroft School where she played on the soccer team. She scored 25 goals and notching 15 assists. In 2011, Castleberry was named the NC 3A Private School Player of the Year, the TISAC Conference Player of the Year, Region 1 Player of the Year. She was also nominated an All-State, All-Region and All-Conference selection in 2011 and 2012. 

Castleberry attended the University of North Carolina at Chapel Hill, one of the most successful women's soccer programs in the United States. She played a key role for the Tar Heels in four years she spent there, becoming a starter from her sophomore year until her senior year.

Club career
On January 12, 2017, Castleberry became the 36th overall pick in the 2017 NWSL College Draft when she was picked by Washington Spirit. On May 6, 2017, she made her debut when she replaced Arielle Ship at the 65th minute of the match against Sky Blue FC. The Spirit waived Castleberry on June 29, 2017.

International career
Castleberry played for the United States U17 in 2011 and 2012. In February 2013 she was called for the United States U18 and in the same year she was called for the United States U20.

References

External links
Player's Profile at North Carolina Tar Heels
Player's Profile at USSF
Player's Profile at Washington Spirit
 

North Carolina Tar Heels women's soccer players
Washington Spirit players
National Women's Soccer League players
American women's soccer players
Living people
1995 births
Washington Spirit draft picks
Soccer players from Raleigh, North Carolina
Ravenscroft School alumni
Women's association football midfielders
Soccer players from North Carolina